The North Dakota Supreme Court is the highest court of law in the state of North Dakota.  The Court rules on questions of law in appeals from the state's district courts.

Each of the five justices are elected on a no-party ballot for ten year terms, arranged such that one seat is contested every two years.  The Chief Justice is elected from the Justices every five years (or upon vacancy) by vote of the Supreme Court justices and the District Court judges.

The Supreme Court is empowered to constitute a Court of Appeals consisting of a three-member panel chosen from active and retired District Court judges, retired Supreme Court justices, and lawyers.  The Court of Appeals only hears cases specifically assigned to it by the Supreme Court, which is done only infrequently.

Under Article 6, Section 4 of the North Dakota Constitution, The North Dakota Supreme Court "shall not declare a legislative enactment unconstitutional unless at least four of the members of the court so decide." North Dakota and Nebraska are the only two states that require a supermajority of state Supreme Court justices to rule a legislative provision unconstitutional.

Justices

Current composition

References

External links

 
Government of North Dakota
North Dakota
North Dakota law
1889 establishments in North Dakota
Courts and tribunals established in 1889